Time for Loving (released in Italy as Sapore di mare) is a 1983 Italian comedy film directed by Carlo Vanzina. It obtained a great commercial success and launched a short-living subgenre of revival-nostalgic comedy films.  It also generated a sequel, Sapore di mare 2 - Un anno dopo. For her performance in this film Virna Lisi won a David di Donatello for Best Supporting Actress and a Silver Ribbon in the same category.

Plot summary 
The film is set in the Sixties, in the Tuscan beach of Forte dei Marmi. A group of young friends spends their holidays at the sea. One of them has a girlfriend, but she loves another man, while his brother is with a beautiful American girl, but he prefers another woman. Finally, a shy student falls in love with an older woman. The end of the movie is a fast-forward in which the same friends gather together after twenty years; however, they are sad because everything is different in their life.

Cast 
 Jerry Calà: Luca
 Christian De Sica: Felicino
 Isabella Ferrari: Selvaggia
 Marina Suma: Marina
 Virna Lisi: Adriana
 Karina Huff: Susan 
 Angelo Cannavacciuolo: Paolo
 Gianni Ansaldi: Gianni
 Giorgia Fiorio: Giorgia

See also    
 List of Italian films of 1983

References

External links
 

1983 comedy films
1983 films
Films directed by Carlo Vanzina
Films set in 1964
Films set in Tuscany
Italian comedy films
1980s Italian-language films
1980s Italian films